The episodes of the 2008 Japanese animated television series Kannagi: Crazy Shrine Maidens are based on the Kannagi manga series written and illustrated by Eri Takenashi. The episodes are directed by Yutaka Yamamoto, and produced by the Japanese animation studio A-1 Pictures, Aniplex, and Ordet. The plot of the episodes follows Jin Mikuriya, a teenager in modern Japan who accidentally summons a goddess by creating a wooden sculpture from his family's ancestral tree. Together with the goddess, who is named Nagi, Jin must destroy the impurities that are gathering in his town because his ancestral tree has been cut down.

The episodes started airing on October 4, 2008 on Tokyo MX in Japan. Other stations that aired the series at later dates include MBS, TVQ, RNB, CTC, TBC, TV Saitama, tvk, Animax, CBC, HBC and BS Japan. The anime adaptation of the manga was confirmed on February 5, 2008 by Ichijinsha, and the official website of the anime began to stream a trailer of the anime on August 15, 2008.

Two pieces of theme music are used for the episodes: one opening theme and one closing theme. Three singles containing the theme music and other tracks by Tomatsu were released on October 29, 2008. Four DVD compilations, each containing two episodes of the anime, were released by Aniplex; the compilations were released between November 26, 2008 and February 25, 2009.

An unaired episode was included in Kannagi DVD volume 7, released on May 27, 2009.

Episode list

References
General

Specific

External links
Official website 
Official A-1 Pictures website 

Kannagi